Ruben Santiago-Hudson (born Ruben Santiago Jr., November 24, 1956) is an American actor, playwright, and director who has won national awards for his work in all three categories. He is best known for his role of Captain Roy Montgomery from 2009 to 2011 on ABC's Castle. In November 2011 he appeared on Broadway in Lydia R. Diamond's play Stick Fly. In 2013 he starred in the TV series Low Winter Sun, a police drama set in Detroit.

Early life
Ruben Hudson was born in 1956 in Lackawanna, New York, the son of Alean Hudson and Ruben Santiago, a railroad worker. He later adopted his mother's maiden name as part of his compound surname. His father was Puerto Rican and his mother was African American. He went to Lackawanna High school, earned his bachelor's degree from Binghamton University, his master's degree from Wayne State University and received an honorary Doctor of Humane Letters from Buffalo State College and Wayne State University.

Career
In 2003, he was the reader in Volume 13 of the HBO film, Unchained Memories: Readings from the Slave Narratives. The series was narrated by Whoopi Goldberg. He wrote Lackawanna Blues (2001), an autobiographical play in which he portrayed himself and some twenty different characters from his past, which was produced in New York at the Joseph Papp Theatre in 2001. He adapted it for a highly acclaimed, award-winning 2005 HBO film, in which the parts were played by different people. It won the Humanitas Prize and earned Emmy and Writers Guild of America Award nominations.

Santiago-Hudson appeared on Broadway in Jelly's Last Jam (1992), written by George C. Wolfe. He received the 1996 Tony Award for Best Featured Actor in a Play for his performance in August Wilson's Seven Guitars.

On television, he has appeared on the daytime soaps Another World and All My Children.  His work in primetime series have included The Cosby Mysteries, New York Undercover, NYPD Blue, Touched by an Angel, The West Wing, Third Watch, Law & Order: Special Victims Unit and five episodes of Law & Order (which coincidentally stars Lackawanna Blues star S. Epatha Merkerson), among others. He starred as New York City Police Captain Roy Montgomery in the ABC series Castle until his character's death occurred in the third season finale. In 2007 he starred in a PBS Nova documentary about the life of chemist Percy Lavon Julian.

In 2013, Santiago-Hudson won the Lucille Lortel Award for Outstanding Director, an Obie Award for Direction, and was nominated for the Drama Desk Award for Outstanding Director of a Play for his work in the Off-Broadway production of August Wilson's The Piano Lesson.

In 2016, he won the Obie Awards Special Citation for Collaboration for his work on Skeleton Crew with Dominique Morisseau and the Atlantic Theater Company.

Selected filmography

Film

Television

Honors
1996, Tony Award for performance in Seven Guitars
2006, Humanitas Award for writing, for HBO film adaptation of his play Lackawanna Blues.
2009, NAACP Lifetime Achievement Theatre Award at the Los Angeles NAACP Theatre Awards. He played Mayor Joe Starks in Their Eyes Were Watching God.

Personal life
Santiago-Hudson has four children: Broderick Santiago and Ruben Santiago III from previous relationships, and Trey and Lily from his marriage with Jeannie Brittan.

When he came to New York in 1983, he was known as Ruben Santiago. He tried to get a part at the Puerto Rican Traveling Theater and was asked if he spoke Spanish, which he does not. When he wanted to work at the Negro Ensemble Company, "they laughed and said, 'We don't have Puerto Ricans.'" So he added his mother's name, Hudson, and eventually won a part in A Soldier's Play at the Ensemble Company.

See also

 List of famous Puerto Ricans
 List of Puerto Ricans of African descent

References

External links
 

 

1956 births
Living people
20th-century American male actors
21st-century American male actors
Male actors from New York (state)
American male film actors
African-American male actors
20th-century American dramatists and playwrights
American male screenwriters
Binghamton University alumni
People from Lackawanna, New York
American people of Puerto Rican descent
Tony Award winners
American male voice actors
American male stage actors
American male television actors
American male dramatists and playwrights
20th-century American male writers
Screenwriters from New York (state)
20th-century African-American writers
21st-century African-American people
African-American male writers